Olyra kempi is a species of longtail catfish native to Bangladesh and India where it is found in Mangaldai in Assam.

References

Bagridae
Fish of Bangladesh
Fish of India
Fish described in 1912